Brownlee Centre may refer to:
The Brownlee Centre for Infectious and Communicable Diseases at Gartnavel General Hospital in Glasgow
The University of Leeds' sports facilities at the Brownlee Centre and Bodington cycle circuit.